Mykhaylo Kokhan or Mykhailo Serhiiovych Kokhan (born 22 January 2001) is a Ukrainian athlete specialising in the hammer throw. He represented his country at the 2019 World Championships finishing fifth the final.

His personal best with a senior implement was 77.39 metres set in Doha in 2019. He improved it with 80.78 m im Székesfehérvár on 5 July 2021.

International competitions

1Sum of the best marks in the two stages.

References

2001 births
Living people
Ukrainian male hammer throwers
World Athletics Championships athletes for Ukraine
Athletes (track and field) at the 2018 Summer Youth Olympics
Ukrainian Athletics Championships winners
Youth Olympic gold medalists for Ukraine
World Youth Championships in Athletics winners
Youth Olympic gold medalists in athletics (track and field)
Athletes (track and field) at the 2020 Summer Olympics
Olympic athletes of Ukraine
21st-century Ukrainian people